The Asian Canoeing Championship is a Canoeing championship organised by the Asian Canoe Confederation for competitors from Asian countries.

List tournaments

Canoe Sprint

Canoe Slalom

Canoe Polo

External links
Official ACC site

 
Asian
Canoeing
Recurring sporting events established in 1985
1985 establishments in Japan